Ex-Otago is an Italian indie pop band formed in 2002.

They debuted in 2003 with the English-language album The Chestnuts Time. Their first album in Italian, Tanti saluti, was released in 2007.

The band participated at the Sanremo Music Festival 2019 with the song "Solo una canzone".

Discography

Studio albums 
 The Chestnuts Time (2003)
 Tanti saluti (2007)
 Mezze stagioni (2011)
 In capo al mondo (2014)
 Marassi (2016)
 Corochinato (2019)

References

External links 

Musical groups established in 2002
Italian pop music groups
Musical groups from Liguria